Philip Christian Hercus AO BSc (20 December 1942 in New Zealand – 3 September 2017) was a naval architect and marine vessel designer in Sydney Australia.

He left New Zealand to attend the faculty of engineering at the University of New South Wales, Australia where in 1967 he gained a Bachelor of Science (Technology) degree in naval architecture. 
 
In 1977), he formed a partnership, namely International Catamaran Pty Ltd designing and building catamarans in Hobart, Tasmania. This combination of Philip Hercus and Bob Clifford made significant advances in fast powered catamaran technology culminating in the introduction of wave piercing catamarans.

Early in 1988, the shipyard partnership was mutually terminated and a design-only company,
International Catamaran Designs Pty Ltd (renamed Incat Designs (Sydney)) was formed as part of the Hercus Marine Group.
The other partner Robert Clifford then commenced designing and building under a new company, Incat Tasmania Pty Ltd.

Incat Designs (Sydney) and Crowther Designs merged in 2005 becoming
Incat Crowther. The key staff from both organizations were maintained with Brett Crowther as Managing Director, Ben Hercus as Commercial Director, Andrew Tuite as Technical Director and Philip Hercus taking the role of Senior Adviser.

Hercus died in September 2017

Awards
Philip Hercus(1992 AGM Michell medal recipient from the Institution of Engineers, Australia).

Clunies Ross National Science and Technology Award in 2000.

Philip Hercus and Robert Clifford received the Order of Australia (AO) in 1995 for service to the shipbuilding industry.

References

External links
 Incat Crowther

2017 deaths
20th-century Australian businesspeople
Officers of the Order of Australia
New Zealand emigrants to Australia
Multihull designers
Year of birth uncertain
Australian businesspeople in shipping
1942 births